Levac is a surname. Notable people with the surname include:

Alex Levac (born 1944), Israeli photojournalist and street photographer
Dave Levac (born 1954), Canadian politician 
Priscilla Levac, Canadian snowboarder

See also
Levač, a historical region in central Serbia